Charles A. Taggart (January 17, 1843 – April 10, 1938) was a Union Army soldier in the American Civil War who received the U.S. military's highest decoration, the Medal of Honor.

Biography
Born on January 17, 1843, in Blandford, Massachusetts, Taggart was living in Otis, Massachusetts, when he joined the Army. He served during the Civil War as a private in Company B of the 37th Massachusetts Infantry. At the Battle of Sayler's Creek on April 6, 1865, he captured a battle flag. For this action, he was awarded the Medal of Honor a month later, on May 10, 1865.

Taggart died on April 10, 1938, at age 95 and was buried at Dayton National Cemetery in Dayton, Ohio.

Medal of Honor citation
Citation:

Capture of flag.

See also

List of American Civil War Medal of Honor recipients: T-Z

References

External links

1843 births
1938 deaths
People from Blandford, Massachusetts
People of Massachusetts in the American Civil War
Union Army soldiers
United States Army Medal of Honor recipients
American Civil War recipients of the Medal of Honor
People from Berkshire County, Massachusetts